Nikoliḱ is a village in the municipality of Dojran, North Macedonia. It is located north of Doiran Lake, near the Greek border.

Demographics
According to the 2002 census, the village had a total of 541 inhabitants. Ethnic groups in the village include:

Macedonians 527
Serbs 13 
Others 1

References

Villages in Dojran Municipality